Mike Connell may refer to:
 Mike Connell (musician) (born 1959), leader of The Connells, American band
 Mike Connell (American football) (born 1956), American football player
 Mike Connell (soccer) (born 1956), soccer player in the North American Soccer League
 Michael Connell (1963–2008), Republican consultant, subpoenaed in a case regarding alleged tampering with 2004 U.S. presidential election
 Michael Connell (golfer) (born 1975), American professional golfer
 Mick Connell (born 1961), Australian wheelchair tennis player
Mike Connell, a character in the film Adventureland

See also
Michael O'Connell (disambiguation)